The Union of Independent Grandes Écoles (UGEI) is an association of French private grandes écoles formed in 1993.

Its goal, according to its founders, is to bring together engineering grandes écoles and business schools which share the same desire for independence. As of 2022, it had 38 members.

Business schools
 EBS Paris - European Business School Paris
 EDC Paris Business School
 Ecole de Management Léonard De Vinci
 ESCE - ESCE International Business School
 École de management de Normandie
 Groupe École supérieure de commerce de Troyes
 Excelia Group
 Montpellier Business School
 ICD - Institut international du commerce et du développement
 INSEEC - INSEEC Business School
 IPAG Business School
 ISC Paris - Institut supérieur du commerce de Paris
 ISG - ISG Business School
 PSB - Paris School of Business

Engineering grandes écoles
 EBI - École de Biologie Industrielle
 ECE Paris - École centrale d'électronique
 EFREI
 EI CESI 
 EIGSI - École d'ingénieurs généralistes La Rochelle
 ELISA Aerospace - École d'ingénieurs des sciences aérospatiales
 EPITA - École pour l'informatique et les techniques avancées
 EPF School of Engineering
 ESB - École supérieure du bois
 ESIGELEC
 ESIEA - École supérieure d'informatique, électronique, automatique
 ESILV - Leonardo da Vinci Engineering School
 École supérieure d'ingénieurs des travaux de la construction de Paris
 École supérieure d'ingénieurs des travaux de la construction de Caen
 École supérieure d'ingénieurs des travaux de la construction de Metz
 ESME-Sudria
 ESTACA - École supérieure des techniques aéronautiques et de construction automobile
 ESTP - École Spéciale des Travaux Publics
 3IL - The Limoges Computer Sciences Engineering School
 IPSA - Institut polytechnique des sciences avancées
 Sup'Biotech - Institut Sup'Biotech de Paris
 ITECH Lyon - Institut textile et chimique de Lyon

Other 
 ESMOD
 Strate School of Design

References

External links
 Official website 

Organizations established in 1993
Education in France
Grandes écoles